"Is the glass half empty or half full?" is a proverbial phrase, used rhetorically to indicate that a particular situation could be a cause for pessimism (half empty) or optimism (half full), or as a litmus test to simply determine an individual's worldview. The purpose of the question is to demonstrate that a situation may be seen in different ways depending on one's point of view.

See also 
 Cooperative principle
 Cognitive bias in animals
 Framing effects (psychology)
 Framing (social sciences)
 Less-is-better effect
 List of cognitive biases
 Silver lining (idiom)

References 

Motivation
English-language idioms